The Thomas Murray House is a historic building located on the east side of Davenport, Iowa, United States. It has been listed on the National Register of Historic Places since 1984.

History
Thomas Murray built this house in 1881 shortly after his marriage to Eva Daniels. He had worked as a surveyor for Scott County for more than a decade. Murray was working as Davenport's City Engineer when this house was built.

Architecture
The Thomas Murray House is typical of the Italianate style houses that were being built in Davenport after the American Civil War. It forsakes the simplicity of Greek Revival decorative elements that were found in earlier Italianate houses for the verticality and millwork embellishment of the Victorian expression. The house features a square form, hipped roof with deck, roof cresting, projecting side pavilions, and a prominent bracketed wrap-around porch. The cornice has brackets and a scalloped motif that is applied to the frieze.

References

External links

Houses completed in 1881
Italianate architecture in Iowa
Houses in Davenport, Iowa
Houses on the National Register of Historic Places in Iowa
National Register of Historic Places in Davenport, Iowa
1881 establishments in Iowa